Anchinia grandis is a species of moth of the family Depressariidae. It is found in Italy, Turkey, Dagestan and Georgia.

References

External links
lepiforum.de

Moths described in 1867
Anchinia
Moths of Europe
Insects of Turkey